Chimbamilonga is a constituency of the National Assembly of Zambia. It covers the towns of Kampinda, Mununu, Mutita, Ndole, Mushi, Nsumbu and Nsama in Nsama District of Northern Province.

List of MPs

References

Constituencies of the National Assembly of Zambia
1991 establishments in Zambia
Constituencies established in 1991